Atoka is a census-designated place in Eddy County, New Mexico, United States. Its population was 1,077 as of the 2010 census. U.S. Route 285 passes through the community. The name was derived from an Indian word, probably Choctaw, whose meaning is unknown.

It is within the Artesia Public Schools school district. Artesia High School is the school district's sole comprehensive high school.

Demographics

References

Census-designated places in New Mexico
Census-designated places in Eddy County, New Mexico